

The Alexander ALX200 was a single-decker bus body built by Alexander of the United Kingdom. It was created for low-floor bus chassis produced from the late 1990s.

It was launched in spring 1996 as a low floor replacement of the Alexander Dash. It was supposed to fill in the gap between the ALX100 minibus and the ALX300 full-size single-decker.

As compared to the Dash, the ALX200 has a more rounded appearance. The styling is completely different from the Dash body, with a rounded roof dome and deep double-curvature windscreen with plastic mouldings under the windscreen to make it look deeper, and large circular headlights and circular front indicators, it also has a separately mounted destination box. The body was primarily built on Dennis Dart SLF and Volvo B6LE. It was given a mild front end refresh during 2001.

The ALX200 sold quite well, and buyers included Stagecoach (which includes 90 on B6LE), FirstGroup, Arriva and Newport (which operated some on 8.8m Dart SLF chassis) and many more. Citybus of Hong Kong purchased ten ALX200-bodied Volvo B6LE buses in 1997 (they returned to UK in 2000). 50 Alexander ALX200s were also bodied on right hand drive Dennis Dart SLF chassis for use by Arriva Netherlands in 2000. A small number were built by Thomas Built Buses from 1999 to 2003, under license for use in the United States as the 'SLF 200'; these buses were fitted with Cummins ISB and Mercedes-Benz engines.

However, with the formation of TransBus International, the ALX200 was phased out, in favour of the more successful Plaxton Pointer in 2001 when production of the Pointer was moved from Scarborough to Falkirk (where Walter Alexander is based).

See also

 List of buses

References

External links

Alexander Dennis buses
Low-floor buses
Midibuses
Vehicles introduced in 1996